Discopodium is a genus of flowering plants belonging to the family Solanaceae.

Its native range is Tropical Africa.

Species:

Discopodium eremanthum 
Discopodium penninervium

References

Solanaceae
Solanaceae genera